Busanjin Station is a railway station in Dong-gu, Busan, southeast South Korea. It is the terminus of the Donghae Line to Pohang, and a stop on the Gyeongbu Line to Seoul. Passenger service was eliminated in 2005, leaving cargo service only.

References

External links

Railway stations in Busan
Busan Metro stations
Railway stations in Korea opened in 1905
Dong District, Busan
1905 establishments in Korea